The Council for International Organizations of Medical Sciences (CIOMS) is an international non-governmental organization of 40 international, national, and associate member groups representing the biomedical science community. It was jointly established by the World Health Organization (WHO) and United Nations Educational, Scientific and Cultural Organization (UNESCO) in 1949 as a successor to the International Medical Congress that organized 17 conferences from 1867 until the 1913 outbreak of World War One.

The group's main goal is advancing public health by publishing guidelines on ethics, product development, and safety in medical research, such as the 2016 International Ethical Guidelines for Health-Related Research Involving Humans.

Governance
The General Assembly of all CIOMS member organizations meets every year, alternating between in-person and teleconference formats, to elect the Executive Committee and its voting President. The Executive Committee of twelve representatives from national and international member groups meets at least one a year, appointing and guiding the Secretariat, comprised of the Secretary-General and their team in Geneva, Switzerland. The Executive Committee can invite non-voting ad hoc observers and technical experts.

Round Tables and Working Groups

After its 1948 founding by UNESCO and the WHO as the Council for Coordination of International Medical Congresses, these UN specialized agencies funded its first conference in Brussels, Belgium. In 1952, the group was renamed as the Council for International Organizations of Medical Sciences (CIOMS) to reflect a focus on guiding member organizations that internally organize field-specific conferences. From 1967 to 1997, it organized annual round tables on medical science topics, offering a standardized conference format:

 I. Biomedical Science and the Dilemma of Human Experimentation Paris, France, 1967
 II. Heart Transplantation Geneva, Switzerland, 1968
 III. Evaluation of Drugs: Whose Responsibility? Liège, Belgium, 1968
 IV. Medical Research: Priorities and Responsibilities, Geneva, Switzerland, 1969
 V. Training of Research Workers in Medical Sciences, Geneva, Switzerland, 1970
 VI. Drug Abuse: Non-Medical Use of Dependence-Producing Drugs, Geneva, Switzerland, 1971
 VII. Recent Progress in Biology and Medicine: Its Social and Ethical Implications, Paris, France, 1972
 VIII. Protection of Human Rights in the Light of Scientific and Technological Progress in Biology and Medicine, Geneva, Switzerland, 1973
 IX. Medical Care and Society, Rio de Janeiro, Brazil, 1974
 X. Health Needs of Society: A Challenge for Medical Education Ulm, Germany, 1976
 XI. Trends and Prospects in Drug Research and Development, Geneva, Switzerland, 1977
 XII. Medical Ethics and the Protection of Human Rights Cascais, Portugal, 1978
 XIII. Economics and Health Policy, Geneva, Switzerland, 1979
 XIV. Medical Ethics and Medical Education, Mexico, 1980
 XV. Human Experimentation and Medical Ethics, Manila, Philippines, 1981
 XVI. Health for All – A Challenge to Research in Health Manpower Development, Ibadan, Nigeria, 1982
 XVII. Biomedical Research Involving Animals – Proposed International Guiding Principles, Geneva, Switzerland, 1983
 XVIII. Health Policy Ethics and Human Values: An International Dialogue, Athens, Greece, 1984
 XIV. Battered Children and Child Abuse, Berne, Switzerland, 1985
 XX. Health Manpower out of Balance. Conflicts and Prospects, Acapulco, Mexico 1986
 XXI. Health Policy, Ethics, and Human Values: European and North American Perspectives, Noordwijk, the Netherlands, 1987
 XXII. Ethics and Human Values in Family Planning, Bangkok, Thailand, 1988
 XXIII. Health Technology Transfer: Whose Responsibility? Geneva, Switzerland, 1989
 XXIV. Genetics, Ethics, and Human Values: Human Genome Mapping, Genetic Screening and Gene Therapy, Tokyo and Inuyama City, Japan, 1990
 XXV. Ethics and Epidemiology: International Guidelines, Geneva, Switzerland, 1990
 XXVI. Ethics and Research on Human Subjects. International Guidelines, Geneva, Switzerland, 1992
 XXVII. Drug Surveillance: International Cooperation – Past, Present, and Future, Geneva, Switzerland, 1993
 XXVIII. Poverty, Vulnerability, the Value of Human Life, and the Emergence of Bioethics, Ixtapa, Mexico, 1994
 The Declaration of Inuyama, a follow-up to the 1990 Conference, Inuyama and Nagayo, 1995
 XXIX. Ethics, Equity, and Health for All, Geneva, Switzerland, 1997
In 1990, CIOMS shifted to a format of assembling working groups of scientists from regulatory bodies, industry, and academia to meet for 2–4 years to reach consensus with other stakeholders and publish recommended guidelines. When the working groups are composed solely of CIOMS members, they are assigned a sequential identifier, whereas partnerships with outside groups are known by their specific topic:

Working Group I (founded 1990): International Reporting of Adverse Drug Reactions
Working Group II (founded 1992): International Reporting of Periodic Drug-Safety Update Summaries
Working Group III (founded 1995): Guidelines for Preparing Core Clinical-Safety Information on Drugs
Working Group IV (founded 1998): Benefit-Risk Balance for Marketed Drugs: Evaluation of Safety Signals
 Standardized Medical Dictionary for Regulatory Activities (MedDRA) Queries (founded 2002)
 Vaccine Pharmacovigilance (founded November 2005)
 Working Group VIII (founded September 2006): Signal Detection
 Working Group IX (founded April 2010): Risk Minimization
 Working Group X (founded September 2010): Meta-Analysis
 Bioethics (founded 2011)
 Vaccine Safety (founded 2013)
 Drug-Induced Liver Injury (founded April 2017)
 Clinical Research in Resource-Limited Settings (founded November 2017)
 Working Group XI (founded April 2018): Patient Involvement
 Working Group XII (founded September 2019): Benefit-Risk Balance for Medicinal Products
 Working Group XIII (founded March 2020): Real-World Data and Real-World Evidence in Regulatory Decision Making
 Working Group XIV (founded May 2022): Artificial Intelligence in Pharmacovigilance

Publications
In March 1959, Austin Bradford Hill, then director of the UK Medical Research Council's Statistical Research Unit, chaired a Vienna-based CIOMS conference on controlled clinical trials. The proceedings, published in 1960, commented on research ethics, experimental design, and statistical analysis. Hill would later outline "Bradford Hill criteria" for establishing causal relationships between statistically correlated phenomena.

This publication laid the groundwork for CIOMS' 1982, 1993, 2002, 2009, and 2016 versions of International Ethical Guidelines for Health-Related Research Involving Humans. These guidelines have been praised for including diverse stakeholders from low- and middle-income countries, compared to the Declaration of Helsinki written by physicians of the World Medical Association. While neither of these documents are legally binding like the Council of Europe's Oviedo Convention, their role as recommended guidelines avoids ethical imperialism.

The first CIOMS working group produced a reporting form for adverse drug reactions, which shaped the International Council for Harmonization of Technical Requirements for Pharmaceuticals for Human Use (ICH)'s E2B guideline. The International Organisation for Standards (ISO), European Committee for Standardization (CEN), and Health Level 7 International (HL7) used these guidelines in publishing the ISO/HL7 27953:2011 standards on Health Informatics: Individual Case Safety Reports (ICSRs) in Pharmacovigilance.

Membership

International Members
 International College of Angiology
 International Federation of Associations of Pharmaceutical Physicians and Pharmaceutical Medicine
 International Federation of Otorhinolaryngological Societies
 International Rhinologic Society
 International Society of Internal Medicine
 International Society of Pharmacoepidemiology
 International Society of Pharmacovigilance
 International Union of Basic and Clinical Pharmacology
 Medical Women's International Association
 World Allergy Organization
 World Association of Societies of Pathology and Laboratory Medicine
 World Medical Association

National Members
 Bangladesh, Bangladesh Medical Research Council
 Belgium, Royal Academy of Medicine of Belgium
 Czech Republic, Czech Medical Association
 Georgia, Georgian Society of Pharmacology
 Germany, Association of the Scientific Medical Societies in Germany
 India, Indian Council of Medical Research
 Israel, The Israel Academy of Sciences and Humanities
 Republic of Korea, Korean Academy of Medical Sciences
 South Africa, South African Medical Research Council
 Switzerland, Swiss Academy of Medical Sciences

Associate Members
 American Society for Bioethics and Humanities
 Asia Pacific Academy of Ophthalmology
 Consulta di Bioetica
 Federation of Polish Medical Organizations Abroad
 Good Clinical Practice Alliance
 International Council for Laboratory Animal Science
 International Federation of Clinical Chemistry and Laboratory Medicine
 International Federation of Medical Students' Associations
 International Medical Sciences Academy
 International Society of Hepatic Encephalopathies & Nitrogen Metabolism
 International Union of Microbiological Societies
 International Union of Physiological Sciences
 Medical Sciences Society of Queensland University, Haiti
 National Fund for Scientific Research
 Saudi Neonatology Society
 World Association for Medical Law
 World Federation of Chiropractic
 World Organization of Family Doctors

See also
 CIOMS/RUCAM scale
 CIOMS I Form
 Pharmacovigilance
 Clinical trial
 Regulation of therapeutic goods

References

External links
 CIOMS Official Site
 World Health Organization - Regulation and Safety
 United Nations Educational, Scientific and Cultural Organization (UNESCO) - Universal Declaration on Bioethics and Human Rights

Clinical research
Medical ethics
Pharmaceuticals policy